Kanguka (Wake Up!) was a Rwandan newspaper founded in 1988 which was critical of the leadership of Juvénal Habyarimana. The magazine Kangura was established as a response to Kanguka.

References

Newspapers published in Rwanda
Publications established in 1988
Magazines published in Rwanda